Vulamehlo Local Municipality was a local municipality in Ugu District Municipality, KwaZulu-Natal. It was located south of the eThekwini municipality and bordered by uMdoni to the east, Mkhambathini and Richmond to the north and Ubuhlebezwe to the west. There is an almost equal split of land between commercial agriculture and traditional settlement areas.  48% of the area is held under communal ownership through traditional authorities; the balance of the area is privately owned, except for Vernon Crookes Nature Reserve, which is managed by Ezemvelo KZN Wildlife.
In 2016 the municipality was divided between eThekwini and uMdoni.

Topography
The municipality was characterised by sharp valleys, river systems, and hilly, broken terrain.  Approximately 30% of the area was estimated to contain slopes of 1:3 and steeper.  The fragmented and steep topography had limited development and agricultural production, and had greatly contributed to the dispersed nature of the area's settlement patterns.

The major river systems within the area were the uMkhomazi, Mpambanyoni and Mthwalume rivers. The other perennial rivers which flow through Vulamehlo included the Nungwane River, Lovu River, Msimbazi River, Mzimayi River, uMzinto and Mkhumbane rivers.

Economy and infrastructure
The Vulamehlo Municipality was largely made up of traditional settlements and was characterised by limited economic activity. The area has high levels of unemployment, with many of those who are employed commuting long distances to other economic centres such as Durban, Port Shepstone, Ixopo, Pietermaritzburg and Johannesburg.

The main sources of income and economic activities in the municipality include subsistence farming and commercial agriculture, including the production of sugarcane and timber plantation.  Small-scale sugarcane growers tend to cluster around Dududu, Kenterton and Mfume.

The dispersed, low-density settlement pattern has made the provision of physical and social infrastructure (roads, water, electricity, clinics, schools, and police stations) relatively difficult and expensive. The network of roads connecting the area's settlements is generally poor.  The area of former Vulamehlo Municipality is one of the localities within the Ugu District that is hardest hit by high unemployment levels, poverty, and negative economic growth rate.

Main places
The 2001 census divided the municipality into the following main places:

Politics 

The municipal council consisted of twenty members elected by mixed-member proportional representation. Ten councillors were elected by first-past-the-post voting in ten wards, while the remaining ten were chosen from party lists so that the total number of party representatives was proportional to the number of votes received. In the election of 18 May 2011 the African National Congress (ANC) won a majority of thirteen seats on the council.
The following table shows the results of the election.

References

External links

Local municipalities of the Ugu District Municipality